McKinley Township may refer to:

Michigan
 McKinley Township, Emmet County, Michigan
 McKinley Township, Huron County, Michigan

Minnesota
 McKinley Township, Cass County, Minnesota

Missouri
 McKinley Township, Douglas County, Missouri, in Douglas County, Missouri
 McKinley Township, Polk County, Missouri
 McKinley Township, Stone County, Missouri

North Dakota
 McKinley Township, Ward County, North Dakota, in Ward County, North Dakota

South Dakota
 McKinley Township, Marshall County, South Dakota, in Marshall County, South Dakota

Township name disambiguation pages